HC Lada Togliatti is a Russian professional ice hockey team based in Tolyatti, Russia. They play in the Supreme Hockey League (VHL).

Due to a lack of a satisfactory arena, the KHL expelled the team. The team dropped one level to the VHL for the 2010–11 season. They were allowed to rejoin the KHL for the 2014–15 season after the opening of the Lada Arena. However, the team was expelled again following the end of the 2017–18 season, and rejoined the VHL.

History
July 1976 - team was founded as Torpedo Togliatti.
August 31, 1976 - first exhibition game against Dizelist Penza (final score was 3:3)
 1991 - Lada enters the Highest division of the Soviet Championship League.
 April 1994 - Lada wins the International Hockey League's Russian Championship, becoming the first-ever team with non-Moscow origin to win the then-IHL Cup
 December 1994 - European Cup debut; silver medals won.
 December 1995 - Lada becomes a vice-champion of Spengler Cup after a loss in Final game to Canadian national team.

 December 30, 1996 - Lada wins European Cup.
 July 18, 2001 - Valeriy Postnikov quits team after having "attacks aimed at me by the media." 
 November 2005 - due to financial troubles, 16 players leave the team. To continue regular season, Lada management uses the players from reserve team.
 January 2006 - Lada becomes first ever Russian team to win the IIHF Continental Cup.

Honors

Champions
 IHL Championship (2): 1994, 1996
 IHL Cup (1): 1994
 IIHF Continental Cup (1): 2006
 European Cup (1): 1996

Runners-up
 Russian Superleague (2): 1997, 2005
 Russian Superleague (2): 2003, 2004
 IHL Championship (2): 1993, 1995
 IHL Cup (2): 1993, 1995
 European Cup (1): 1994
 Spengler Cup (1): 1995

Season-by-season record

Note: GP = Games played, W = Wins, L = Losses, OTL = Overtime/shootout losses, Pts = Points, GF = Goals for, GA = Goals against

See also
HC Lada Togliatti songs and anthems
FC Lada Togliatti

References

External links
Lada Togliatti official website
Continental cup 2006 

 
Ice hockey teams in Russia
Ice hockey clubs established in 1976
Sport in Tolyatti
Former Kontinental Hockey League teams